Sun City is a Ghanaian television series produced  by Deltrac Media in 2003 which was aired on GTV.

Plot 
The television series was set in the university environment to tell a story of the relationships, studying and other daily experiences of university students.

Production 
The production set were on University of Ghana, Legon and the University of Cape Coast in the Central Region. The theme song was done by Amandzeba.

Cast 

 Suzzy Williams
 Ekow Smith-Asante
 Benjamin Kwadey
 Van Vicker
 Gavivina Tamakloe
 Albert Kuvodu
 Kojo Dadson
 Ekow Blankson
 Nii Odoi Mensah
 Andy Nii Akrashie
 Prince Olani Yeboah
 Jayne Heide Aklamanu
 Albert Jackson-Davis
 Ekow Bissiw Jones
 Nana Yaw Aboagye-Saah 
 Nii Saka Brown
 Joana Sackey
 Annette Obeng

References

External links 
Sun City Series

Ghanaian television series
2000s drama television series
2003 Ghanaian television series debuts
Ghana Broadcasting Corporation original programming